is a 1969 Japanese kaiju film directed by Ishirō Honda, written by Shinichi Sekizawa, and produced by Tomoyuki Tanaka. The film, which was produced and distributed by Toho Co., Ltd, is the tenth film in the Godzilla series, and features the fictional monster characters Godzilla, Minilla, and Gabara. The film stars Tomonori Yazaki, Kenji Sahara, and Hideyo Amamoto, with special effects by Honda and Teruyoshi Nakano, and features Haruo Nakajima as Godzilla, Marchan the Dwarf as Minilla, and Yasuhiko Kakuyuki as Gabara.

All Monsters Attack was released theatrically in Japan on December 20, 1969. It received a theatrical release in the United States in 1971 by Maron Films, under the title Godzilla's Revenge, on a double bill with the 1967 film Night of the Big Heat. The film is often retrospectively considered one of the worst Godzilla films, although Honda had come to consider it as one of his favorites in the series.

Plot
Ichiro Miki is a highly imaginative but lonely latchkey kid growing up in urban and polluted Kawasaki. Every day he comes home to his family's empty apartment. His only friends are a toymaker named Shinpei Inami and a young girl named Sachiko. Every day after school, Ichiro is tormented by a gang of bullies led by a child named Sanko Gabara. To escape his loneliness, Ichiro sleeps and dreams about visiting Monster Island. During his visit, he witnesses Godzilla battle three Kamacuras, brutally outpowering the three. Ichiro is then chased by a rogue Kamacuras and falls into a deep cave, but luckily avoids being caught by Kamacuras. Shortly afterwards, Ichiro is rescued from the cave by Minilla. Coincidentally, Ichiro quickly learns that Minilla has bully problems too, as it is bullied by an abusive monster known as Gabara.

Ichiro is then awoken by Shinpei who informs him that his mother must work late again. Ichiro goes out to play, but is then frightened by the bullies and finds and explores an abandoned factory. After finding some souvenirs (tubes, a headset, and a wallet with someone's [necessarily the suspect's] license), Ichiro leaves the factory after hearing some sirens close by. After Ichiro leaves, two bank robbers who were hiding out in the factory learn that Ichiro has found one of their driver's licenses and follow him in order to kidnap him.

Later, after his sukiyaki dinner with Shinpei, Ichiro dreams again and reunites with Minilla. Together they both watch as Godzilla fights Ebirah, Kumonga, a giant condor, and some invading jets. Then in the middle of Godzilla's fights, Gabara appears and Minilla is forced to battle it, and after a short and one-sided battle, Minilla runs away in fear. Godzilla returns to train Minilla how to fight and use its own atomic breath. However, Ichiro is woken up this time by the bank robbers and is taken hostage as a means of protection from the authorities.

Out of fear and being watched by the thieves, Ichiro calls for Minilla's help and falls asleep again where he witnesses Minilla being beaten up by Gabara again. Finally, Ichiro helps Minilla fight back at Gabara and eventually, Minilla wins, catapulting the bully through the air by a seesaw-like log. Godzilla, who was in the area watching comes to congratulate Minilla for its victory but is ambushed by a vengeful Gabara. Godzilla easily beats down Gabara and sends the bully into retreat, never to bother Minilla again. Now from his experiences in his dreams, Ichiro learns how to face his fears and fight back, gaining the courage to outwit the thieves just in time for the police, called by Shinpei, to arrive and arrest them. The next day, Ichiro stands up to Sanko and his gang and wins, regaining his pride and confidence in the process. He also gains their friendship when he plays a prank on a billboard painter.

Cast

Production

Due to production costs, All Monsters Attack includes extensive stock footage of Ebirah, Horror of the Deep, Son of Godzilla, King Kong Escapes, and Destroy All Monsters. The filmmakers also employed the same Godzilla suit used for Destroy All Monsters. Despite being credited as the film's special effects director, Eiji Tsuburaya was not actively involved with the production. Director Ishirō Honda not only directed the drama scenes but the special effects scenes as well, with assistance from Teruyoshi Nakano, who was a first assistant special effects director at the time. Honda would later confirm that Tsuburaya was given credit as the film's special effects director "out of respect", and the reason why Honda took over Tsuburaya's duties was due to "budget and time constraints". A small studio was used for the production, where both the special effects and drama scenes were filmed (usually the two were filmed in separate studios).

Release

All Monsters Attack was released theatrically in Japan on 20 December 1969 where it was distributed by Toho. The film was the first "Toho Champion Matsuri", a festival-style program that included shorts and feature films.

The film had been test-screened under the title Minya, Son of Godzilla in the United States. The version was edited further and released with an English-language dubbed version in 1971 under the title Godzilla's Revenge. This version of the film was distributed by Maron Films as a double feature with Island of the Burning Damned.

Home media
The film was released on home video in the United States in 2007 with its original Japanese version.

In 2019, the Japanese version was included in a Blu-ray box set released by the Criterion Collection, which included all 15 films from the series' Shōwa era.

Critical reception

The film is commonly regarded by critics and fans as being one of the worst Godzilla films, with many criticizing the film’s tone, characters, and overwhelming use of stock footage. On the review aggregator website Rotten Tomatoes, the film has an approval rating of 25%, based on eight critic reviews. Anthony Gramuglia and Nicholas Raymond of Screen Rant each named All Monsters Attack the worst Godzilla film, with Gramuglia calling it a "downright painful film", and Raymond referring to it as "universally disliked by Godzilla fans, and for good reason".

Matthew Jackson of Looper.com ranked the film among the worst Godzilla films, criticizing its usage of stock footage, referring to Minilla as "annoying", and writing that "There's nothing necessarily wrong with the premise, but the execution leaves a lot to be desired".

Jacob Knight of /Film ranked the film as the 27th best Godzilla movie out of 31 films, writing that "While it's almost universally accepted that Godzilla's Revenge is the worst Godzilla movie by enthusiasts, there's an audacious 'so bad it's good' element to the proceedings that makes it endlessly watchable". Patrick Galvan of Syfy Wire defended the film, calling it "a rather sweet little movie and one of Ishiro Honda's most earnest efforts in the Godzilla series. A poignant gem dealing with serious issues — many of them still relevant today — providing food for thought for adults while entertaining its target audience." Honda had since stated that All Monsters Attack is "one of my favorites" of the Godzilla films.

References
Footnotes

Bibliography

External links

1960s children's fantasy films
1960s monster movies
1960s science fiction films
1969 films
Films about father–son relationships
Films about bank robbery
Films about bullying
Films about children
Films directed by Ishirō Honda
Films produced by Tomoyuki Tanaka
Films set in Kanagawa Prefecture
Films set on fictional islands
Films with screenplays by Shinichi Sekizawa
Giant monster films
Godzilla films
Japanese children's films
Japanese fantasy films
Japanese sequel films
1960s Japanese-language films
Kaiju films
Toho films
1960s Japanese films